This is a listing of films produced and/or distributed by film company Producers Releasing Corporation, or PRC for short.

Films

1939

1940

1941

1942

1943

1944

1945

1946

1947

1948

See also
 List of Grand National Pictures films
 List of Eagle-Lion Films

References

Producers Releasing Corporation films
Producers Releasing Corporation